Brilliant was launched at Whitby in 1813. She spent the bulk of her career sailing between London and the Cape of Good Hope (CGH). Finally, she became waterlogged while sailing between New Brunswick and Dublin and on 7 February 1823 her crew and passengers had to abandon her.

Career
Brilliants first captain was A. Smales. The Register of Shipping (RS) for 1815 showed her master as A.Smales, her owner as J.Barry, and her trade as Whitby–Shields. She was sold to London owners in 1814.

She first appeared in Lloyd's Register (LR) in 1814.

Fate
Young Phoenix rescued the two passengers and the crew, who had taken to the tops of her masts as Brilliant became waterlogged.

Notes, citations, and references
Notes

Citations

References
 
 

1814 ships
Ships built in Whitby
Age of Sail merchant ships of England
Maritime incidents in February 1823